Fernand Jourdenais (25 March 1933 – 29 February 2016) was a Progressive Conservative member of the House of Commons of Canada. He was a businessman and trader by career.

He represented the Quebec riding of La Prairie where he was first elected in the 1984 federal election and re-elected in 1988, therefore becoming a member in the 33rd and 34th Canadian Parliaments.

Jourdenais left federal politics after his defeat in the 1993 federal election by Richard Bélisle of the Bloc Québécois party.

External links

References

1933 births
2016 deaths
Businesspeople from Montreal
French Quebecers
Members of the House of Commons of Canada from Quebec
Politicians from Montreal
Progressive Conservative Party of Canada MPs